Roberto Merhi Muntan (born 22 March 1991), is a Spanish racing driver who drove in Formula One for the Manor Marussia F1 Team during the 2015 season. Merhi has also raced in the Formula Renault 3.5 Series for Pons Racing, and won the Formula 3 Euro Series championship, while driving for Prema Powerteam. In 2018, he drove for MP Motorsport and Campos Vexatec Racing in the FIA Formula 2 Championship. Since 2019, he has competed in sportscar racing, including finishing third in the 2019–20 Asian Le Mans Series.

Career 

Merhi was born in Castellón de la Plana, Spain to Brazilian parents of Lebanese descent.

Formula Renault 
In 2007, Merhi mainly competed in Italian Formula Renault and the Formula Renault Eurocup, finishing 4th and 18th respectively. In 2008 he competed in the West European Series, where he was runner-up, and he finished 4th in the Eurocup. He also did five races in the Spanish Formula Three Championship.

Formula Three 

Merhi made the full-time step-up to Formula Three in 2009 when he was signed by Manor Motorsport for their Formula 3 Euro Series campaign, finishing seventh, with four podiums. He moved to Mücke Motorsport for the 2010 season, improving on his debut season by finishing fifth in the standings, with four podiums, including his maiden win at Hockenheim.
2011 saw another change in teams for Merhi, this time joining Prema Powerteam. Merhi subsequently won the championship, getting 20 top-3 finishes, including 11 wins.

DTM

2012 

On 3 April 2012, Mercedes announced the revival of the Mercedes-Benz Junior Team that has guided several notable drivers in their racing careers like Heinz-Harald Frentzen, Karl Wendlinger and Michael Schumacher. With that announcement came the news that Roberto Merhi, together with the reigning Formula Renault 3.5 Series champion Robert Wickens and DTM-sophomore Christian Vietoris, would become a part of the new Junior Team and that the three of them would drive for the Junior Team in the 2012 DTM season. In addition to that, 7-time F1 World Champion Michael Schumacher will be involved with the three drivers by serving as a mentor. Merhi's entry into the DTM meant that he would be one of two Spaniards in the drivers field, together with Miguel Molina. Merhi scored no points in 2012 for Persson Motorsport.

2013 

In his second season, he switched to HWA Team. He collected a 7th place at the Norisring and two 10th finishes. In the final race of the season he recorded his best finish of 2nd to end the season 15th in the standings.

Formula Renault 3.5 Series 
thumb|Merhi during Race 1 of the 2014 Formula Renault 3.5 Series season at Nürburgring.
Merhi moved to Formula Renault 3.5 Series in 2014 with Zeta Corse. He finished third in the championship.

Merhi switched to Pons Racing for the 2015 season. He competed in the first round at Aragon, but was replaced by Alex Fontana so as to focus on his commitments with Marussia during the second round in Monaco, which had their races on the same date. He rejoined the team following the event.

In round five in Austria, Merhi was deemed at fault for a massive collision with Nicholas Latifi when Merhi slowed at the finish line. He was disqualified from the race and banned from the next two events, and has since not returned to the series.

Formula One

Caterham (2014) 
Merhi made his first appearance in a Formula One car for the Caterham team during practice for the 2014 Italian Grand Prix. It is believed that he was being evaluated for a race seat in place of Kamui Kobayashi, but had yet to qualify for an FIA Super Licence.

Marussia (2015) 

However, Marussia did not compete in Australia due to a technical problem. In the Malaysian Grand Prix Merhi competed in his first Formula One race despite problems to his teammate Stevens' car. Merhi failed to set a lap time within 107% of the fastest time in Q1, but the race stewards allowed Merhi to start the race. Merhi finished in 15th place, 3 laps down on race winner Sebastian Vettel. In the Chinese Grand Prix, Merhi finished in 16th place behind his teammate Stevens. In Bahrain and Spain Merhi also finished behind Stevens. However, in the Monaco Grand Prix Merhi finished in 16th ahead of Stevens. In the Canadian Grand Prix, Merhi qualified ahead of Stevens and would start in 16th thanks to penalties to Sebastian Vettel and Max Verstappen. As well as that Jenson Button failed to set a lap time in qualifying because of an engine issue. In the race, Merhi was a minute ahead of Stevens but on lap 56, he was forced to retire due to a drive-shaft problem. It was the first time that Merhi failed to finish a Formula One race that he started, but he remained ahead of Stevens in the Drivers' Championship. In Austria, Merhi finished in 14th position, 3 laps behind race winner Nico Rosberg. Merhi was dropped in favour of Alexander Rossi for five of the last seven Grands Prix of 2015, the exceptions being Russia and Abu Dhabi, before taking a subsequent demotion to Formula E in 2017 and Formula 2 in 2018.

Development driver (2019-2020) 
For 2019, Merhi revealed that he was working with an F1 team as a development driver, but his contract prevented him from revealing which team he was working with. Merhi continued to work as a development driver for 2020.

Formula E 
In April 2017, it was announced Merhi would be joining the series for the fourth season. However, he did not sign with any team.

FIA Formula 2 Championship

2017 

In 2017, Merhi replaced Stefano Coletti at Campos Racing for the Barcelona round of the championship. He also competed at the Spa, Monza and Yas Marina rounds, for Rapax Team

2018 

He scored a full-time drive for the 2018 Formula 2 season with MP Motorsport. Before the Belgian round, he left the team and was replaced by their GP3 Series driver Dorian Boccolacci. He then joined Campos for the final two rounds of the season, replacing Roy Nissany.

2022 

Merhi made his Formula 2 return for Campos Racing at the Austrian round of 2022, replacing an injured Ralph Boschung. He retired from the sprint race, but scored third position in the feature race, coming back from 21st position. After his good result in Austria and the fact that Ralph Boschung was still injured, Merhi also competed in the Le Castellet round but he had to retire from both races. He also competed at the Budapest round.

S5000 Tasman Series 
In 2021, Merhi competed in the Australian single-seater championship, the S5000 Tasman Series, racing for Team BRM. He got 3 podiums, one of them a victory, thus proclaiming himself runner-up.

Japanese Super GT 
For 2022, Roberto Merhi will compete in Japanese SuperGT for the Team LeMans in an Audi R8 LMS GT3 alongside drivers Yoshiaki Katayama and Shintaro Kawabata, making his debut at the second round of the championship at Fuji.

Super Formula Lights 
In September 2022, Merhi announced that he would compete in the final round at Okayama of the 2022 Super Formula Lights.

Racing record

Career summary 

† As Merhi was a guest driver, he was ineligible for championship points.
* Season still in progress.

Formula racing

Complete Formula 3 Euro Series results 
(key)

Complete GP3 Series results 
(key) (Races in italics indicate fastest lap)

Complete Formula Renault 3.5 Series results 
(key) (Races in bold indicate pole position; races in italics indicate fastest lap)

Complete Formula One results 
(key) (Races in bold indicate pole position; races in italics indicates fastest lap)

Complete FIA Formula 2 Championship results 
(key) (Races in bold indicate pole position) (Races in italics indicate points for the fastest lap of top ten finishers)

† Driver did not finish the race, but was classified as he completed over 90% of the race distance.

Complete S5000 results 

* Season still in progress.

Complete Super Formula Lights results 
(key) (Races in bold indicate pole position) (Races in italics indicate fastest lap)

GT/Touring car results

Complete Deutsche Tourenwagen Masters results 
(key) (Races in italics indicate fastest lap)

Complete FIA World Endurance Championship results

Complete 24 Hours of Le Mans results

Complete European Le Mans Series results 
(key) (Races in bold indicate pole position; results in italics indicate fastest lap)

Complete Super GT Results 
(key) (Races in bold indicate pole position) (Races in italics indicate fastest lap)

References

External links 

 

1991 births
Living people
Sportspeople from Castellón de la Plana
Spanish racing drivers
Marussia Formula One drivers
Italian Formula Renault 2.0 drivers
Formula Renault Eurocup drivers
Formula Renault 2.0 WEC drivers
Euroformula Open Championship drivers
British Formula Three Championship drivers
Formula 3 Euro Series drivers
Formula 3 Euro Series champions
Spanish GP3 Series drivers
Deutsche Tourenwagen Masters drivers
Stock Car Brasil drivers
World Series Formula V8 3.5 drivers
Spanish Formula One drivers
Spanish people of Lebanese descent
Spanish people of Brazilian descent
Sportspeople of Lebanese descent
24 Hours of Le Mans drivers
Spanish Protestants
FIA Formula 2 Championship drivers
FIA World Endurance Championship drivers
Prema Powerteam drivers
Manor Motorsport drivers
MP Motorsport drivers
Asian Le Mans Series drivers
European Le Mans Series drivers
Super GT drivers
CRS Racing drivers
Jenzer Motorsport drivers
BVM Racing drivers
Epsilon Euskadi drivers
Mücke Motorsport drivers
HWA Team drivers
Zeta Corse drivers
Double R Racing drivers
Pons Racing drivers
Campos Racing drivers
Rapax Team drivers
G-Drive Racing drivers
Team LeMans drivers
Eurasia Motorsport drivers
Tasman Series drivers
Mercedes-AMG Motorsport drivers
Hitech Grand Prix drivers
Garry Rogers Motorsport drivers
B-Max Racing drivers